Direct Hits is a greatest hits album by American rock band the Killers. It was released on November 11, 2013, by Island Records. The album includes tracks from the band's first four studio albums and features two new tracks—"Shot at the Night" and "Just Another Girl", produced by Anthony Gonzalez of M83 and Stuart Price, respectively.

Regarding the album's release, vocalist Brandon Flowers noted, "This record feels like a great way to clean everything up and move onto the next thing."

Background and recording
In 2013, during the band's Battle Born World Tour, the Killers began recording new material for a possible single release or new studio album. In June 2013, drummer Ronnie Vannucci Jr. noted, "[We're] not just [recording] demos. Real recordings. I mean, you never know what it's gonna be, I guess. But we have our engineer, and we're working with a couple of surprise guests, in the producer capacity. Some of it is sounding really cool. We can be guilty of making things so ornate, and sometimes that's a bad thing. So I always have conversations with Brandon [Flowers] about working from a smaller palette, simplifying things. If these new tracks develop a theme, a common thread, then that could be the start of something." Guitarist Dave Keuning elaborated, "I'm not saying a new album is going to come out or anything like that. But sometimes people just put out songs or it gets used for some kind of compilation. We'd like to get a new song out there soon."

The track "Shot at the Night" was produced by Anthony Gonzalez of French band M83, who had previously supported the Killers on their Day & Age World Tour. The band's label, Island Records, subsequently suggested Gonzalez as a possible producer for the band, following the success of M83's sixth studio album, Hurry Up, We're Dreaming (2011). Guitarist Dave Keuning noted, "There was a mutual thing like, 'Yeah we think he's good. We'll try him out.' It's something we finally agreed with our label on." Regarding the band's collaboration with Gonzalez, Flowers stated, "He's one of these new school producers. He's a technical wizard, but you can't discount his musicality. A lot of people do, because of the involvement of computers, but he's a real musician, too. He and Stuart Price may be known for working on the digital side of things, but they're also two of the most musical guys I've ever met."

Stuart Price, who had previously worked with the band on both their third studio album, Day & Age (2008), and on the Battle Born (2012) track, "Miss Atomic Bomb", produced the second of the two new songs, "Just Another Girl". Flowers noted, "[Stuart Price has] become like my brother now: we work well together, and I'm always impressed with his musicality and his taste. It's in a different vein from 'Shot At The Night', it's more of a narrative. You're 'in' the song in a different way."

Some critics have suggested the band released the album in order to fulfill a contractual obligation.

Title
According to vocalist Brandon Flowers, Direct Hits was originally entitled Cream. He notes, "The initial idea, which maybe was better, was Cream. It was my idea. It was a play on the fact that we put out a B-sides compilation called Sawdust. And so it made sense to call the ones that were our best Cream." Flowers' original idea for the album sleeve featured the Hoover Dam and a reservoir of cream.

Release
Direct Hits was announced on September 16, 2013—the 10-year anniversary of the band's first UK show, which took place at London's Dublin Castle. Regarding this, Flowers noted, "We were so excited about being on English soil for the first time that night. I remember falling on my ass during 'Jenny Was a Friend of Mine', but NME gave the show a positive review, and that really helped to launch us."

When their label first raised the idea of a greatest hits album, Flowers says the band was surprised: "I'm a little young to already be putting out a greatest-hits album. This is premature, but the label was going to do it anyway ... so we decided to get involved with the artwork and contribute a couple of songs." Drummer Ronnie Vannucci Jr. agreed: "We'd wait another 10 years if it was up to us, but it's a contractual thing. We can fill a CD so it makes good business sense at this time of year. However, it's not like we're so pleased with ourselves we want to put it out. It feels like a douchie move."

Flowers is proud of the release: "It's a celebration of this decade for us. Some people maybe wouldn't do so much for a 'Best of', but I was introduced to a lot of music from bands' 'Best ofs', from Elton John to The Cars to Otis Redding, Johnny Cash... So I want to promote it! I'm happy to have one."

In the week after the album's release, four of the Killers' songs either entered or re-entered the UK Singles Chart, including "Shot at the Night" (number 23), "Just Another Girl" (number 83), "When You Were Young" (number 87), and "Mr. Brightside" (number 88).

Omissions
Direct Hits does not include the singles "Bones", "The World We Live In" or "Here With Me", nor does it include b-side compilation promotional singles, "Tranquilize", "Shadowplay" or the popular and critically acclaimed non-single from the band's debut album, Hot Fuss, "Jenny Was a Friend of Mine". Battle Born album track, "The Way It Was", however, is included on the track listing, and was not released as a single. Regarding its inclusion, Flowers noted, "With 20/20 hindsight, this song probably should've been a single. That'll probably be what's written on its headstone! When we play it live and Dave's riff starts, it's magic. We all love that song, so that's why it's on here."

A further Battle Born album track, "Be Still", is included as the closing track on the deluxe edition. Flowers states: "In this climate that we're in, or whatever you want to call it, people pick and choose songs, and I think in the confusion of that process, they sometimes don't know about certain songs. This is one that we're very proud of and that we love, so we felt it would have more of a chance if we put it on the record."

Critical reception

In a positive review, AllMusic's Stephen Thomas Erlewine wrote: "The main benefit of Direct Hits, especially for those listeners who have always doubted the skills of The Killers, is how the operatic ambitions of Sam's Town feel not so extravagant when bookended by selections from Day & Age and Battle Born. All three of the albums – which are represented by three cuts a piece – sound strong here but what really has lasted are those singles from 2004's Hot Fuss [...] which now seem to capture a particular moment in time and yet also transcend it." Writing for Clash, Robin Murray gave the album a positive review, but noted that it was too soon for a career-spanning release: "Charting the long rise of a true pop phenomenon, Direct Hits is almost dragged under by the weight of the band’s success – each song simply feels too fresh, too well known to warrant the archival. A nice refresher, if a little unnecessary."

Track listing

Notes
  signifies an additional producer
  signifies a remixer

Personnel
Credits adapted from the liner notes of the deluxe edition of Direct Hits.

Studios
Recording locations

 The Hearse (Berkeley, California) – recording 
 Cornerstone Recording Studios (Los Angeles, California) – recording 
 Studio at the Palms (Las Vegas, Nevada) – recording 
 Criterion Studios (London) – additional recording, additional engineering 
 Battle Born Studios (Las Vegas, Nevada) – engineering ; recording 
 Blackbird Studios (Nashville, Tennessee) – recording 
 killthemessenger Studio (Las Vegas, Nevada) – engineering 

Mixing and mastering locations

 Cornerstone Recording Studios (Los Angeles, California) – mixing 
 Eden Studios (London) – mixing 
 The Town House (London) – mixing 
 Assault & Battery (London) – mixing 
 Olympic Studios (London) – mixing 
 Battle Born Studios (Las Vegas, Nevada) – mixing 
 The Exchange Mastering (London) – mastering 
 Golden Ratio (Montreal) – mixing 
 The Lodge (New York City) – mastering

The Killers
 Brandon Flowers
 Dave Keuning
 Mark Stoermer
 Ronnie Vannucci Jr.

Additional musicians
 Stuart Price – additional keyboards, programming 
 Matt Norcross – drums

Technical

 Jeff Saltzman – production, recording 
 The Killers – production 
 Mark Needham – mixing 
 Alan Moulder – mixing ; production, recording 
 Flood – production, recording, mixing 
 Mark Gray – additional engineering 
 Neeraj Khajanchi – additional engineering 
 Max Dingel – additional engineering 
 Andy Savours – mix engineering 
 Stuart Price – production, mixing 
 Robert Root – engineering ; recording ; mixing 
 Dave Emery – mixing assistance 
 Alex Dromgoole – mixing assistance 
 Ted Sablay – additional engineering 
 Brendan O'Brien – production, recording 
 Steve Lillywhite – additional production 
 Damian Taylor – additional production ; production 
 Catherine Marks – mix engineering 
 John Catlin – mix engineering 
 Felix Rashman – mix assistance 
 Anthony Gonzalez – production 
 Mike Sak – engineering 
 Calvin Harris – remix 
 Simon Davey – mastering

Artwork

 Warren Fu – art direction
 Andy West – design, layout
 Colin Lane – photography
 Williams + Hirakawa – photography
 Torey Mundkowsky – photography
 Wyatt Boswell – photography
 Kristen Tiengst – art and photography production
 Tai Linzie – art and photography production
 Andy Proctor – package production

Charts

Weekly charts

Year-end charts

Decade-end charts

Certifications

References

2013 greatest hits albums
Albums produced by Alan Moulder
Albums produced by Brendan O'Brien (record producer)
Albums produced by Flood (producer)
Albums produced by Steve Lillywhite
Albums produced by Stuart Price
Island Records compilation albums
The Killers compilation albums